Marek Kozioł (born 1 June 1988) is a Polish professional footballer who plays as a goalkeeper for ŁKS Łódź.

References

Polish footballers
1988 births
Living people
Association football goalkeepers
Sandecja Nowy Sącz players
Zagłębie Lubin players
Stal Mielec players
Korona Kielce players
ŁKS Łódź players
Ekstraklasa players
I liga players
Sportspeople from Nowy Sącz